George François "Frans" de Bruijn Kops (28 October 1886 in Benkoelen, Dutch East Indies – 22 November 1979 in The Hague) was a Dutch football (soccer) player who competed in the 1908 Summer Olympics. He was a member of the Dutch team, which won the bronze medal in the football tournament.

Club career
He played for HBS from The Hague, after joining them from Achilles Rotterdam.

International career
De Bruijn Kops made his debut for the Netherlands in an April 1906 friendly match  against Belgium and earned a total of 3 caps, scoring 1 goal. His final international was an October 1908 1908 Summer Olympics against Sweden.

References

External links
 

1886 births
1979 deaths
People from Bengkulu
Association football forwards
Dutch footballers
Netherlands international footballers
Footballers at the 1908 Summer Olympics
Olympic footballers of the Netherlands
Olympic bronze medalists for the Netherlands
Medalists at the 1908 Summer Olympics
Olympic medalists in football
HBS Craeyenhout players
Dutch people of the Dutch East Indies